Ira High School or Ira School is a public high school located in unincorporated Ira, Texas (USA) and classified as a 1A school by the UIL. It is part of the Ira Independent School District located in southwestern Scurry County. In 2015, the school was rated "Met Standard" by the Texas Education Agency.

Athletics
The Ira Bulldogs compete in these sports - 

Baseball
Basketball
Cross Country
6-Man Football
Softball
Tennis
Track and Field

References

External links
Ira ISD
List of Six-man football stadiums in Texas

Schools in Scurry County, Texas
Public high schools in Texas
Public middle schools in Texas
Public elementary schools in Texas